Cambus is a bus service for the University of Iowa.

Cambus may also refer to:.
Cambus, Clackmannanshire, a village in Scotland
Stagecoach in Cambridge, a bus company in Cambridge, England; trading name of Cambus Ltd